Speed of the Wind was a record-breaking car of the 1930s, built for and driven by Captain George Eyston.

The car was designed by Eyston and E A D Eldridge, then built by the father of Tom Delaney It was powered by an unsupercharged version of the V-12 Rolls-Royce Kestrel aero engine.  The car was too large and heavy for circuit racing and was already underpowered by the standards of the absolute speed record breakers. This car was designed for endurance, more than peak power. Running a supercharged engine with the fuel and materials technology of the day would never have lasted the duration. This particular engine was obtained second-hand from Rolls-Royce, where it had previously powered an airflow fan in an engine test cell. Having always been intended for long-term use at ground level, it had been built without the Kestrel's usual supercharger.

For streamlining, distinctive features of the car are the two small "nostrils", headlights and air inlets in the nose. These produced less drag than a typical inlet and flat honeycomb radiator. The engine was cooled instead by a surface radiator wrapped around the top of the bodywork, just in front of the driver.

During testing, the car appears to have run, although not competitively, at either Brooklands or Montlhery.

Records 
Speed of the Wind was built for long-duration speed records, which were the domain of Ab Jenkins and the Bonneville salt flats of Utah. Jenkins was fond of competition and was instrumental in encouraging British teams to travel to Bonneville.

1935 

In September 1935, shortly after Campbell's 300 mph record with Blue Bird, Eyston broke Jenkins' 24-hour record and raised it to

1936 
For the 1936 season, Jenkins created the Mormon Meteor by fitting a Curtiss Conqueror V12 into his previous Duesenberg chassis. Eyston returned, with E A D Eldridge as team manager, and his colleague from Brooklands, John Cobb in the Napier-Railton as another competitor.

The Meteor made a second attempt, and this time remained reliable.

Demise 
The remains of the car were destroyed by Luftwaffe bombing during World War II.

Models 

Meccano produced a model of the car as Dinky Toys, both pre- and post-war. Tommy Doo Toys and Johillco also produced a model of this car.

Notes

References

The Dinky Toys Encyclopaedia.

External links 

Two photographs in the Brooklands photo archive show it outside Delaney & Sons. garage, a popular location for racing in this era
 Outside the Delaney & Sons Sunbeam-Talbot garage
 Outside the Delaney & Sons Sunbeam-Talbot garage
In both photographs, George Eyston is standing at the far left. A third photograph is likely to be the same location.
 Rear view

Wheel-driven land speed record cars
1935 in motorsport
1936 in motorsport